Joshua "JD" Walker (born April 8, 1983) is an American songwriter and record producer, based in Los Angeles, California, United States. He has worked with notable artists such as, Cher, Jason Derulo, The Wanted, Kylie Minogue, Charice, Adam Lambert, Enrique Iglesias and many more.

Life and career

Career beginnings

Musical career

Artistry

Family

Partial discography
Ollie Gabriel - Running Man EP (Jive Germany)
"Running Man"- Writer, Producer

Kylie Minogue
Kiss Me Once - "Les Sex" Writer, Producer. certified GOLD BPI

Cher –  Closer to the Truth certified GOLD RIAA certified Platinum CRIA
"Woman's World" Writer, producer, musician 
"Red" Writer, additional production
"Pride" Writer, additional production

Jason Derulo – "Future History"
"Pick up the Pieces" Writer, Producer certified GOLD RIAA
Auburn
‘’LA LA LA’’ (RCA) writer, producer. Producer certified GOLD RIAA

 Prom (2011)
 Prom: Original Motion Picture Soundtrack -  Neon Trees – "Your Surrender" (JD Walker Remix) certified Platinum RIAA

Namie Amuro
Feel - "Let Me Let You Go" Writer, Producer. certified Platinum RIAJ

Round2Crew (Atlantic)
"Your Girlfriend Thinks I'm the Sh't" and "Maker Her Say" Writer, Producer

Bella Thorne (Hollywood/Disney)
"Daydream" Writer, Producer

Rockie Fresh
Electric Highway "Barrel Of A Gun" Writer, Producer

Super Junior
Hero "Tuxedo" Writer, Producer. certified Platinum RIAJ

Daichi Miura
The Entertainer; "Baby Just Time" Writer, Producer. certified GOLD RIAJ

FEMM
 "Feed the Fire" Writer, Producer

Kiki Rowe (Sony)
 "Work" feat. P.Reign

Studio albums

Walker is published by Songs Music Publishing.

References

1983 births
Living people
American music video directors
Record producers from California
Songwriters from California
American pop musicians